Stow-on-the-Wold is a market town and civil parish in Gloucestershire, England, on top of an 800-foot (244 m) hill at the junction of main roads through the Cotswolds, including the Fosse Way (A429), which is of Roman origin. The town was founded by Norman lords to absorb trade from the roads converging there. Fairs have been held by royal charter since 1330; a horse fair is still held on the edge of town nearest to Oddington in May and October each year.

History
Stow-on-the-Wold, originally called Stow St Edward or Edwardstow after the town's patron saint Edward, probably Edward the Martyr, is said to have originated as an Iron Age fort on this defensive position on a hill. Indeed, there are many sites of similar forts in the area, and Stone Age and Bronze Age burial mounds are common throughout the area. It is likely that Maugersbury was the primary settlement of the parish before Stow was built as a marketplace on the hilltop nearer to the crossroads, to take advantage of passing trade. Originally the small settlement was controlled by abbots from the local abbey, and when the first weekly market was set up in 1107 by Henry I, he decreed that the proceeds go to Evesham Abbey.
In 1330, a royal charter by Edward III set up an annual 7-day market to be held in August. The royal charter granted a fair where sheeps and horses were allowed to be sold. In 1476, Edward IV replaced that with two 5-day fairs, two days before and two days after the feast of St Philip and St James in May, and similarly in October on the feast of Edward the Confessor (the saint associated with the town). The aim of the annual charter fairs was to establish Stow as a place to trade and alleviate the unpredictability of the passing trade. These fairs were located in the square, which is still the town centre.

Civil war
Stow played a role in the English Civil War. A number of engagements took place in the area, the local church of St Edward being damaged in one skirmish. On 21 March 1646, the Royalists, commanded by Sir Jacob Astley, were defeated at the Battle of Stow-on-the-Wold, with hundreds of prisoners being confined for some time in St Edwards. This battle took place one mile north of Stow on the Wold. After initial royalist success, the superiority of the parliamentary forces overwhelmed and routed the royalist forces. Fleeing the field, the royalists fought a running fight back into the streets of Stow, where the final action took place, culminating in surrender in the market square.

Modern 
As the fairs grew in fame and importance, so did the town. Traders dealing in livestock added many handmade goods, and the wool trade was always prominent. Daniel Defoe reported in the 18th century that 20,000 sheep were sold in one day. Many alleys known as tures that run between buildings into the market square were used in herding sheep to be sold.

Most of the buildings around the market square dated from the 18th to 19th century including St Edward's Hall (the present-day library).

As the wool trade declined, people began to trade in horses. The practice continues, although the fair has been moved from the square to a large field near the village of Maugersbury every May and October. It remains popular, with roads around Stow blocked by the extra traffic for many hours.

However, there has been controversy surrounding Stow Fair. The many visitors and traders have attracted more vendors not dealing in horses. Local businesses used to profit from the increased custom, but in recent years most pubs and shops close for 2–3 miles around due to the risks of theft or vandalism.

Governance
The town belongs to the Stow electoral ward. This covers the parishes of Stow, Maugersbury and Swell. In 2010 these parishes had a total population of 2,594.

Stow-on-the-Wold has an active Parish Council with 10 members.

Stow-on-the-Wold is represented on Cotswold District Council by the Liberal Democrat Councillor Dr. Dilys Neill, who was elected in the 2019 local elections. The Stow Division is represented on Gloucestershire County Council by the Conservative Councillor Nigel Moor.

Stow Ward

Gloucestershire County Council

Economy
Scotts of Stow, a mail order company, also has two shops in the town.

Popular culture

 Given its exposed spot on the top of Stow Hill, the town is often referred to as "Stow on the Wold, where the winds blow cold."

 Stow-on-the-Wold featured prominently in the eleventh episode of series 6 of Top Gear, when Jeremy Clarkson reviewed the Ford F-Series there. He chose it as a venue because it is a typical community in the English countryside, which Clarkson compares to the American countryside in the episode.

Transport links
Several roads link Stow to surrounding villages. Over longer distances, the Fosse Way (A429) runs from Exeter to Lincoln, the A424 from Burford into the A44 and to Evesham, and the A436 between Cheltenham and Gloucester.

From 1881 until 1962, Stow was served by Stow-on-the-Wold railway station on the Great Western Railway's Banbury and Cheltenham Direct Railway. The nearest station is now Moreton-in-Marsh, some 4 miles (6 km) from Stow on the Cotswold Line between Hereford and London Paddington. An alternative is Kingham railway station, some 5 miles (8 km) from Stow on the same line.

Notable people 
Clement Barksdale (1609–1687), writer and poet, was Rector of Stow-on-the-Wold from 1660 to 1687.
Edmund Chilmead (1610–1654), writer, translator and musician, was born in the town.
George Wilkinson (1814–1890), was the architect of Stow-on-the-Wold Workhouse in 1836.
George Pepall (1876–1953), county cricketer, was born in the town.
Harry Ferguson (1884–1960), engineer and inventor of the Ferguson tractor, died in the town.
Frederic Bartlett (1886–1969), experimental psychologist and academic, was born in the town.
John Howland (1895–1958), county cricketer, was born in the town.
John Entwistle (1944–2002), musician, producer and bass guitarist of the Who, bought Quarwood in Stow-on-the-Wold in 1976. His funeral was held at St Edward's Church.
David Loder (born 1964), racehorse trainer, was born in the town.

References

External links
Town council's web site

 
Towns in Gloucestershire
Market towns in Gloucestershire
Civil parishes in Gloucestershire
Cotswolds
Cotswold District
Charter fairs